Thomas Kimmwood Peters (June 27, 1879 – 1973) was a pioneer American motion picture producer, newsreel cameraman, photographer, educator, and inventor.

Education
Attended public elementary schools and high school in the Los Angeles area, 1884-94.
Attended Peace College in Mexico City from 1896 to 1898.
Earned Ph.D. at Oglethorpe University, 1939.

Association with the motion picture industry
Peters began his photography work in the motion picture industry around 1899, with the Pathe Freres film company of France. Later, when he left them, he continued to work throughout Europe at various companies in the motion picture industry to develop his skills. He also did photography and motion picture work at Karnak and Luxor in Egypt.

Peters was associated with the Cosmos Film Company in San Francisco, California, which later became Exactus Photo Film Corporation of Palo Alto. He became its first president and general manager when it officially started operations on August 28, 1914. The company stated that its purpose was 

In the beginning, Exactus had a list of well-respected California educators to serve on its board of directors. However, a lack of good business management and closing skills in obtaining financial backing caused its failure only two years later. There were also clashes of misunderstandings between the educators and Exactus' technicians that exacerbated the situation. By the end of 1916, Peters held an auction of the physical items held by the bankrupt company to raise money to pay off its creditors. What little stock left was turned over to the Palo Alto Film Company.

Peters kept the technical and educational value of the Exactus films at a high quality in spite of these tumultuous times. At the Panama–Pacific International Exposition in 1915, his company won two gold medals and one bronze medal for films they had produced.

Association with Oglethorpe University

Thornwell Jacobs, originator of the Crypt of Civilization (the world's first modern time capsule located at Oglethorpe University), hired Peters to serve as the project archivist and general manager of development and construction.

One of the reasons Peters was hired was for his unique skills in photography. He used his knowledge to preserve on microfilm and film footage items to be entered in the Crypt for a 6,000-year storage. Peters recorded on film such historical figures as Adolf Hitler and Joseph Stalin. He also included President Franklin D. Roosevelt and Benito Mussolini.

Peters and his staff of student assistants worked on the Crypt project from 1937 until 1940 when it was sealed permanently. They put on cellulose acetate microfilm many historical events of the 19th and 20th centuries. The microfilm reels were placed into airtight receptacles for preservation. The staff and Peters initiated backup methods in case the acetate didn't survive. One method Peters developed was duplicate "metal film." It was as thin as paper.

Peters also worked on developing Oglethorpe University's historical photographic collections. Peters was also director of the China Air Force School at Oglethorpe University, 1945-46. He was also professor of audio-visual education at the university.

According to Oglethorpe University Peters had been the only newsreel photographer to film the San Francisco earthquake of 1906 and the associated fire. He was also the first to film the construction of the Panama Canal.

Outline of career
 Artist with International Botanical Expedition to Yucatán, 1898.
 Cameraman with Pathe Freres, Vincennes, France, 1899.
 Toured Europe and Northe Africa making motion pictures with a Kinetoscope, 1900.
 Freelanced in Paris, 1902.
 Opened Peters Scenic Studio in Los Angeles, 1902.
 President of Peters Photographic Expeditions. Made 5 expeditions to Asian countries, Australia and the South Seas, 1904-05.
 Motion pictures of San Francisco earthquake aftermath, 1906.
 Motion pictures of construction of the Panama Canal, 1909.
 Technical director of several motion picture companies.
 Author and correlator of standard text films for classroom use at Palo Alto and F.B.O. Studio, Hollywood.
 Inaugurated first regulator teaching films in New York Schools, 1920.
 Professor of psychology training specialist and manufacturing research engineer at Lockheed Aircraft Company.
 Historian at the Los Angeles County Hollywood Museum Motion Picture TV.
 Owner of Photographic Museum, Frontier Village, San Jose, California.

Authored works
 Portals of the Past 
 Sunoef Dixie (the script) 
 Trap to Catch a Shadow 
 History of Motion Picture Mechanisms (autobiography) 
 Technique of Concertography: Prelude to the Atomic Era

Inventions
 Invented several models of the Exactus camera, 1912 - 1914.
 Invented the first microfilm camera using 35 mm film to photograph documents, 1915.
 Invented and patented many vacuum and rare gas devices, including first commercial rare gas tubes, 1924.

References

Bibliography
 Peters, Thomas Kimmwood, The Story of the Crypt of Civilization, (Oglethorpe University Press, Atlanta, 1940).
 Slide, Anthony, The New Historical Dictionary of the American Film Industry, Fitzroy Dearborn 1998, 
 The Preservation of History in the Crypt of Civilization, journal of Society of Motion Picture Engineers (February 1940), pp. 209–10.
 Who's Who in America With World Notables'' (Chicago, 1978), subject of item # 1712 - "Thomas Kimmwood Peters", Library of Congress Card No. 43-3789, 
 Library of Congress, ID No: MSS61200
Papers of Thomas Kimmwood Peters
Span Dates: 1896-1973 (bulk 1915-1968)
Creator: Peters, Thomas Kimmwood, 1879-1973
Repository: Manuscript Division, Library of Congress, Washington, D.C.

Newsreel footage

Early film of the 1906 San Francisco earthquake aftermath. Views of destruction taken from a vehicle moving east down Market Street.

1879 births
1973 deaths
Pioneers of photography
Cinema pioneers
American experimental filmmakers
20th-century American inventors
Oglethorpe University faculty
Artists from Norfolk, Virginia
Articles containing video clips
American photographers